Julio César Ferrón Álvez (born October 12, 1988 in Montevideo) is a Uruguayan footballer currently playing for as a defender for Universitario de Sucre in the Liga de Futbol Profesional Boliviano.

In January 2012, he signed a six-month loan with Argentine side Defensa y Justicia.

References

External links
 
 

1988 births
Living people
Uruguayan footballers
Uruguayan expatriate footballers
Danubio F.C. players
El Tanque Sisley players
Defensa y Justicia footballers
Expatriate footballers in Argentina
Association football defenders